The 1983 NCAA Division II women's basketball tournament was the second annual tournament hosted by the NCAA to determine the team national champion of women's collegiate basketball among its Division II membership in the United States.

Virginia Union defeated defending champions Cal Poly Pomona in the championship game, 73–60, to claim their first Division II national title. 

The championship rounds were contested at the Springfield Civic Center in Springfield, Massachusetts, hosted by Springfield College.

Qualifying
A total of twenty-four teams qualified for this year's tournament, an increase of eight from 1982.

Regionals

Northeast/East - Buffalo, New York
Location: Koessler Athletic Center

Great Lakes/West - Pomona, California
Location: Kellogg Gym

South/South Atlantic - Richmond, Virginia
Location: Arthur Ashe Center

Midwest/South Central - St. Cloud, Minnesota
Location: Halenbeck Hall

Final Four – Springfield, Massachusetts
Location: Springfield Civic Center Host: Springfield College

All-tournament team
Paris McWhirter, Virginia Union (MOP)
Barvenia Wooten, Virginia Union
Jackie White, Cal Poly Pomona
Lisa Ulmer, Cal Poly Pomona
Carla Eades, Central Missouri State

See also
 NCAA Women's Division III Basketball Championship
 1983 NCAA Division I women's basketball tournament
 1983 NCAA Division III women's basketball tournament
 1983 NCAA Division II men's basketball tournament
 1983 NCAA Division III men's basketball tournament
 NAIA Women's Basketball Championships

References
 1983 NCAA Division II women's basketball tournament jonfmorse.com

NCAA Division II women's basketball tournament
1983 in sports in Massachusetts